Meroo River, also called Meroo Creek, a watercourse that is part of the Macquarie catchment within the Murray–Darling basin, is located in the central western district of New South Wales, Australia.

The river rises on the western slopes of the Capertee Valley, near Triangle Swamp, and flows generally north, west, and north-west, joined by three minor tributaries, before reaching its confluence with the Cudgegong River, where it is impounded as Lake Burrendong; descending  over its  course.

See also

 Rivers of New South Wales
 List of rivers of Australia

References

Rivers of New South Wales
Murray-Darling basin